Brendan Bower is an Australian rules footballer who played for Richmond, Essendon and North Melbourne. He made his debut with Richmond against St Kilda in round 5 of 1986 season and played 92 games with Richmond. He was drafted by Essendon in 1991 AFL draft and played 3 games in the 1992 season. In the 1992 AFL draft he was picked up by North Melbourne and played 2 games for them in 1993.

External links

1966 births
Living people
Essendon Football Club players
North Melbourne Football Club players
Richmond Football Club players
Australian rules footballers from Victoria (Australia)
Victorian State of Origin players